The 2021-22 Vivo Pro Kabaddi League was the eighth season of Pro Kabaddi League. The season began on 22 December 2021. The usual travelling caravan format was changed to a single venue hosting all the matches of the season. Kanteerava Indoor Stadium, Bangalore was initially announced as the venue, but was later changed to the Sheraton Grand Hotel and Convention Center located in Whitefield, Bangalore.

Each team played against all the other teams twice, and the top 6 teams proceed to the play-offs. The player auctions for the season 8 were conducted from August 29 to 31, 2021 in Mumbai. Dabang Delhi defeated Patna Pirates in the final match to win their maiden title

Teams

Personnel and sponsorships 
Note: Table lists in alphabetical order.

Foreign players
Each team can sign maximum 3 foreign players in the squad.

Sponsorship
Title Sponsor

 Vivo

Associate Sponsors

 Tata Motors
 Dream11
 MFine
 A23
 BYJU'S
 Mutual Funds

Partners

 Parimatch News
 Officer's Choice
 Dhani
 UltraTech Cement

Broadcast Sponsor
 Star Sports

Digital Streaming Partner
 Disney+ Hotstar

Viewership

This year PKL was played without an audience and shed the caravan style format. Instead, all teams  played at a single location in Bengaluru. Looking back at IPL last year, media planners suggest that format changes will have little to no impact on the viewership of the tournament. Mashal Sports has also announced that triple headers will be played on all Saturdays which may have a positive impact on the viewership over weekends.

Points table

League stage

Playoffs

Bracket

Eliminator 1

Eliminator 2

Semi Final 1

Semi Final 2

Final

Statistics

Most Raid Points

Most Tackle Points

Total Points

References

Pro Kabaddi League seasons
Pro Kabaddi League
Pro Kabaddi League